Evert Hokkanen (7 July 1864, Urjala – 26 June 1918, Hämeenlinna) was a Finnish farmworker and politician. He was a member of the Parliament of Finland from 1907 to 1910, representing the Social Democratic Party of Finland (SDP). He was imprisoned in 1918 for having sided with the Reds during the Finnish Civil War. He died in detention.

References

1864 births
1918 deaths
People from Urjala
People from Häme Province (Grand Duchy of Finland)
Social Democratic Party of Finland politicians
Members of the Parliament of Finland (1907–08)
Members of the Parliament of Finland (1908–09)
Members of the Parliament of Finland (1909–10)
People of the Finnish Civil War (Red side)
Prisoners who died in Finnish detention